Algicola sagamiensis is a marine bacterium isolated from sea water in Sagami Bay. It was originally named Pseudoalteromonas sagamiensis but was reclassified in 2007 into the genus Algicola.

References

Alteromonadales
Bacteria described in 2003